The 2022–23 Louisville Cardinals women's basketball team will represent the University of Louisville during the 2022–23 NCAA Division I women's basketball season. The Cardinals, will be led by 16th-year head coach Jeff Walz, and play their home games at the KFC Yum! Center.  This season will be in their ninth year competing in the Atlantic Coast Conference.

Previous season

They finished the season 29–5 overall and 16–2 in ACC play to finish in second place.  As the second seed in the ACC tournament, they were upset by seventh seed Miami in the Quarterfinals.  They received and at-large bid to the NCAA tournament and were the first seed in the Wichita Regional.  They defeated sixteenth seed Albany in the First Round, ninth seed Gonzaga in the Second Round, fourth seed Tennessee in the Sweet Sixteen, and third seed Michigan in the Elite Eight before falling to eventual champions, and first seed South Carolina in the Final Four.  This was the Cardinals fourth appearance in the Final Four in program history.

Off-season

Departures

Incoming transfers

Recruiting Class

Source:

Roster

Schedule and results

Source

|-
!colspan=6 style=| Non-Conference Regular season

|-
!colspan=6 style=| ACC Women's Tournament

|-
!colspan=6 style=| NCAA Women's Tournament

Rankings

References

Louisville Cardinals women's basketball seasons
Louisville
Louisville Cardinals women's basketball, 2020-21
Louisville Cardinals women's basketball, 2020-21
Louisville